Cookhill is a village and civil parish in Worcestershire, England, on the county border near Alcester. It is close to a former Cistercian Priory of the same name.

History

In the Domesday Book; Cookhill is mentioned as being in the Hundred of Ash in the County of Worcestershire. The total population was of five households - 2 smallholders, 2 slaves and 1 burgess.

Notable Houses

Cookhill Priory

Dragon Farm

Churches

St. Paul's

Baptist Chapel

Politics
Cookhill has been represented since 2017 by Rachel Maclean of the Conservative Party as part of the Redditch County Constituency, and is part of  the South Redditch ward of Worcestershire County Council represented by Conservative Cllr. Anthony Hopkins. Representatives on Wychavon District Council are Cllr's Audrey Steel and David Wilkinson.

Roads
Within the Village the major roads are; Salt Way, Brandheath Lane, Wood Lane, Church Lane (leading onto Cladswell Lane, Mearse Lane and Dogbut Lane), Chamberlain Lane, Oaktree Lane and Chapel Lane, all running off the A441 main Evesham Road. The A441 used to continue beyond the junction with the A422 towards Evesham but this has been downgraded to the B4088.  The village is served by bus service 149 Worcester - Redditch operated by Diamond. This previously continued to Birmingham as service 150.

Public Houses

The Nevill Arms

Notable residents 
 Sidney Meteyard (1868–1947), artist
 Kate Eadie (1878–1945), jeweller

References

External links 
 Cookhill Parish Council
 Cookhill Village Hall

Villages in Worcestershire